Greg Carr is an Australian former rally driver. Carr won the Australian Rally Championship three times and dominated the prestigious Castrol International Rally in the 1970s as well as winning numerous other rallies.

Carr rose through the ranks of Australian rallying driving a Datsun 1600 starting in the 1973 rallying season. In 1975 Carr and navigator Wayne Gregson won the Bunbury Curran Rally. Carr began his domination of his local Canberra rally, the Don Capasco Rally (later called the Castrol International Rally) in 1975. He won the prestigious event six times in succession.

In 1976 Carr won four rallies in a Gerry Ball-sponsored Datsun 180B SSS. Then in 1977 Carr's burgeoning talent was rewarded by Colin Bond, the manager of a new two-car Ford works rally team, when Bond signed up Carr to drive a works Ford Escort RS2000. Carr had his first Australian Rally Championship round win with the Ford works team in the 1977 Bega Valley Rally. In the Southern Cross Rally that year Carr led until late on the last night when put out by alternator failure.

In 1978 Carr won the Australian Rally Championship for the Ford works team. During this era Carr and Bond in their Escorts clashed with Ross Dunkerton and George Fury in their works Datsuns in what is widely regarded as a classic period of Australian rallying. Carr won numerous rallies during his four years at the Ford rally team, including four victories in the Castrol International Rally which was held in the forests around Canberra.

In 1980 Carr again went close to winning the prestigious Southern Cross Rally finishing second to Ross Dunkerton and ahead of teammate Finnish world rally champion Ari Vatanen. The Ford works rally team was wound up at the end of the 1980 season.

In 1987 Greg Carr won his second national rally championship, with navigator Fred Gocentas, in an Alfa Romeo GTV6. Two years later Carr added a third Australian Rally Championship title to his name driving a Lancia Delta Integrale with Mick Harker as his navigator.

Career results

References

Ten Top Drivers (Forsyth Publications) 1979
AMSAG - History of the Southern Cross Rally
Australian Competition Yearbook 1978
Bega Valley Rally - History Part 3

Australian rally drivers
Living people
Sportspeople from Canberra
Year of birth missing (living people)